The 1983 Georgia Bulldogs football team represented  the University of Georgia during the 1983 NCAA Division I-A football season.

Schedule

Roster

Rankings

Game summaries

Auburn

References

Georgia
Georgia Bulldogs football seasons
Cotton Bowl Classic champion seasons
Georgia Bulldogs football